Ayor Makur Chuot (born 4 August 1989) was elected to the Western Australian Legislative Council as a Labor Party member for North Metropolitan region at the 2021 state election, and as the first WA state MP of African and South Sudanese ancestry.

Prior to being elected Chuot was an accountant and international model.

Chuot and her family emigrated to Australia refugees in 2005, after her father was killed in the Second Sudanese Civil War. Prior to migrating, the family had spent ten years in the Kakuma refugee camp in Kenya. Her sister is Akec Makur Chuot, an AFLW player for Richmond.

References 

Living people
Members of the Western Australian Legislative Council
Australian Labor Party members of the Parliament of Western Australia
21st-century Australian politicians
Women members of the Western Australian Legislative Council
Australian accountants
Australian female models
South Sudanese emigrants to Australia
Australian models of South Sudanese descent
1989 births
21st-century Australian women politicians